is a railway station in Ibaraki, Osaka Prefecture, Japan, operated by West Japan Railway Company (JR West).

Line
JR-Sōjiji Station is served by the JR Kyoto Line (Tōkaidō Main Line).

Layout
The station has one island platform serving two tracks. The platform is equipped with platform doors.

History
The name of the new station was announced on August 8, 2017. The station opened on March 17, 2018.

Adjacent stations

See also
 List of railway stations in Japan

References

External links

  

Ibaraki, Osaka
Tōkaidō Main Line
Railway stations in Japan opened in 2018
Railway stations in Osaka Prefecture